Joshua Daniel Kail (born March 29, 1986) is an American politician. He is a Republican representing the 15th district in the Pennsylvania House of Representatives.

Early life

Kail earned a Bachelor of Arts in Political Science from Geneva College in 2008, and a JD from Regent University School of Law in 2011.

Political career

In 2018, Kail ran for election to represent District 15 in the Pennsylvania House of Representatives. He was unopposed in the Republican primary, and won the general election with 61.5% of the vote. In 2020, he was re-elected with 71.7% of the vote.

Committee assignments 

 Education
 Environmental Resources & Energy
 Judiciary
 Rules

Electoral record

References 

Living people
Republican Party members of the Pennsylvania House of Representatives
21st-century American politicians
1986 births